Irmgard Bensusan (born 24 January 1991) is a South African born Paralympic sprinter who now competes for Germany, mainly in T44 classification events. Bensusan competed at the 2016 Summer Paralympics where she won three silver medals in the 100, 200 and 400 metre sprints.

Personal
Bensusan was born on 24 January 1991 in Pretoria, South Africa. She studied accounting at the University of Johannesburg.

Athletics career
Bensusan first took up athletics as an able-bodied competitor whilst living in South Africa. In 2009 whilst competing in a hurdle event, she tore the nerves in her right knee. The injury resulted in paralysis in her right leg below her knee. Bensusan looked at becoming classified as a para-sport athlete but was unable to gain a classification from the South African Paralympic Committee. As her mother was German she was eligible to represent Germany, and so she travelled to Europe to take up residency in Leverkusen and was subsequently classified as a T44 track and field athlete.

In 2014, she represented Germany at her first major international event, travelling to Swansea in Wales to compete in the 2014 IPC Athletics European Championships. There she won three silver medals, in the 100m, 200m and 400m sprints. In the two shorter events she was beaten by the Dutch 'Blade Babe' Marlou van Rhijn, and in the 400 metres she was beaten by a new world record time by France's Marie-Amélie Le Fur. A year later Bensusan took part in the 2015 IPC Athletics World Championships in Doha.

2016 Summer Paralympics
In the buildup to the 2016 Summer Paralympics in Rio, Bensusan took part in her second European Championships, this time in Grosseto, Italy. Bensusan was able to win gold in both the 100m and 200m events. Her times running up to Rio saw Bensusan qualify for all three sprint events at the Summer Paralympics: the 100m, 200m and 400m races. She took silver in all three events, losing the gold medals to van Rhijn (100m and 200m) and Le Fur (400m).

References

External links
 
 

1991 births
Living people
South African female sprinters
Paralympic athletes of Germany
Paralympic silver medalists for Germany
Paralympic medalists in athletics (track and field)
Amputee category Paralympic competitors
Athletes (track and field) at the 2016 Summer Paralympics
Athletes (track and field) at the 2020 Summer Paralympics
Medalists at the 2016 Summer Paralympics
University of Johannesburg alumni
World Para Athletics Championships winners
21st-century South African women